Rawlinson may refer to:

 Sir Alfred Rawlinson, 3rd Baronet (1867–1934), English soldier, aviator and Olympic sportsman
 Alfred Rawlinson (bishop) (1884–1960), Bishop of Derby, 1935–1959
 Edward Rawlinson (1912–1992), Canadian businessman
 George Rawlinson (1812–1902), English scholar and historian
 Sir Henry Rawlinson, 1st Baronet (1810–1895), British diplomat and orientalist
 Sir Henry Rawlinson, a fictional character created by Vivian Stanshall
 Henry Rawlinson, 1st Baron Rawlinson (1864–1925), British general
 Jana Rawlinson, Australian athlete previously known as Jana Pittman
 John Frederick Peel Rawlinson (1860–1926), English barrister and member of parliament
 Peter Rawlinson, Baron Rawlinson of Ewell (1919–2006), British politician, barrister, and author
 Peter Rawlinson (engineer), Welsh-born engineer for Lucid Motors
 Richard Rawlinson (1690–1755), English minister and antiquarian
 Robert Rawlinson (1810–1898), English civil engineer
 Thomas Rawlinson (disambiguation), several people

Other 
 Rawlinson Road, Oxford, England
 NPS Rawlinson Roadway, a typeface used by the United States National Park Service
 Peter Rawlinson Award, an Australian environmental prize established in 2001

English-language surnames